Omisus is a genus of European non-biting midges in the subfamily Chironominae of the bloodworm family Chironomidae.

Species
O. caledonicus (Edwards, 1932)
O. pica Townes, 1945

References

Chironomidae
Diptera of Europe